The following is a list of characters in the manga series Banana Fish by Akimi Yoshida. Voice actors in the 2018 anime adaptation of Banana Fish are noted where applicable.

Primary characters
  
 
Formerly a sex slave, enforcer, and heir to the criminal empire of Dino Golzine, Ash joined the mob as a young child after running away from his home in Cape Cod. Ash breaks from Golzine to solve the mystery of "banana fish", which drove his brother to insanity in Vietnam. Ash commands extraordinary intellect, charisma, and tactical foresight, in addition to being an expert marksman and knife fighter. His physical appearance is based on Stefan Edberg and, as the series progresses, River Phoenix.

  
 
 A nineteen-year-old Japanese college student and former competitive pole vaulter, Eiji was forced into early retirement due to injury and now works as Ibe's assistant. He travels to New York to complete a report on street gangs, where he becomes a close confidant to Ash. Eiji is kind and gentle, though frequently stubborn and naïve. Ash's deep affection for Eiji is frequently exploited by his enemies, who correctly intuit that Ash's willingness to sacrifice himself to protect Eiji is his sole weakness. Eiji's appearance is based on the actor Hironobu Nomura.

Ash's and Eiji's affiliates
 
 
Deployed in the same platoon as Ash's older brother Griffin, Ash initially blames Max for his brother's mental illness, though he later becomes one of Ash's closest confidants in his investigation of banana fish. His physical appearance is based on Harrison Ford.

 
 
 A Japanese photojournalist who comes to New York City to do a report on street gangs.

 
 
 Ash's older brother. A veteran of the Vietnam War, Griffin became severely mentally handicapped after being used as a test subject for banana fish. Later killed in the crossfire of a confrontation with Golzine's men.

 
 
 A pathologist at the University of California. As a student, he and his brother Abraham accidentally created Banana Fish while attempting to synthesize LSD.

 
 
 A journalist and Max's ex-wife. Jessica takes Ash's group in during their investigation of banana fish, and later joins the group for their final battle against Golzine. She and Max reconcile their relationship towards the end of the series.

Corsican mafia
 
 
 A kingpin in the Unione Corse who aims to expand his power by selling banana fish to the United States government. Ash's former patron and later adopted father, he has groomed Ash since he was a child to be his sex slave and heir to his criminal empire.

 
 
 A vindictive and cruel ex-member of Ash's street gang, who allies himself with Golzine in order to usurp Ash.

 
 
 The younger brother of Alexis. He defied his brother's wishes to destroy banana fish and continues to develop and weaponize the drug for the Corsican mob into his adulthood. As a doctor during the Vietnam War, he tested banana fish on unknowing soldiers, including Griffin.

  
 
 The director of a federal mental health facility secretly funded by the Union Corse. He experiments on violent criminals to observe the effects of banana fish.

 
 
Prior to the events of the series, he is employed by Golzine to train Ash to become Golzine's heir. He subsequently retires to the Caribbean but is called out of retirement by Golzine to capture Ash. A highly effective killer who dutifully carries out any contract for which he is hired, he ultimately refuses to kill Eiji on Yut-Lung's orders and defects to Ash's gang.

 
 
 A sadistic mercenary and former member of the French Foreign Legion, hired by Golzine to capture Ash.

Chinese mafia
 
 
 A Chinese American gang leader who controls Chinatown. Was a close friend and ally to Ash, the two met while in juvenile prison together. Shorter is sociable and gregarious, in contrast to Ash's stoicism. He is injected with banana fish by Golzine's men and ordered to kill Eiji, though he is able to ask Ash to kill him before he is able to do so.

 
 
 The youngest son of the Lee family, the largest crime family in China. He is first introduced under the alias . Possessing an encyclopedic knowledge of herbs and poisons, he allies with Golzine to determine the chemical composition of banana fish. Yut-Lung possesses a deep grudge towards his brothers, who raped and murdered his concubine mother, and eventually violently deposes them. He is hostile towards Ash and Eiji and frequently attempts to capture and murder the latter.

 
 
 A fourteen-year-old Chinese American boy who assumes control of the Chinatown gang upon Shorter's death. He becomes a reluctant ally to Ash after initially blaming him for Shorter's death. Though outwardly child-like and carefree, he is a skilled tactician and leader.

 
 
 Sing's half-brother. Though Sing forgives Ash for killing Shorter, Lao continues to distrust him and resents Sing's deference to Ash in the ongoing gang war. In the final scene of the story, Lao stabs and kills Ash.

Street gangs
 
 
 The second-in-command in Ash's gang.

 
 
 An African-American boy and a member of Ash's gang. Killed in a confrontation with Golzine's men.

 
 
 A lieutenant in Ash's gang assigned to protect Eiji.

  
 
 A lieutenant in Ash's gang assigned to protect Eiji.

 
 
 The leader of Black Sabbath, an African American gang that controls Harlem. Though initially neutral, he later allies with Ash in his battles against Arthur and Golzine.

New York City Police Department
 
 
 A diabetic homicide detective assigned to investigate deaths caused by banana fish.

 
 
 A homicide detective. A friend of Max, the two met while in a police academy. In a romantic relationship with Nadia, Shorter Wong's older sister.

References

Banana Fish